The 1912 Carmarthen Boroughs by-election was a Parliamentary by-election held in the United Kingdom on 24 January 1912 for the Carmarthen Boroughs constituency in Wales. The constituency of Carmarthen Boroughs was centred on the boroughs of Carmarthen and Llanelli. It returned one Member of Parliament (MP)  to the House of Commons of the Parliament of the United Kingdom, elected by the first past the post voting system.

Vacancy

The sitting Liberal MP, W. Llewelyn Williams was appointed Recorder of Swansea, and required by the laws at the time, to seek re-election in a by-election.

Electoral history
The constituency had returned Liberals at every election since 1876, apart from in 1895 when a Liberal Unionist won. At the last General election in December 1910, Williams was returned unopposed. However at the previous General Election, there was a contest;

Candidates
Forty-five-year-old Llewelyn Williams was a local man having been born in the Towy Valley. He was educated at Llandovery College and Brasenose College, University of Oxford. He built a career in south Wales as a journalist before being called to the Bar from Lincoln's Inn in 1897. At the 1906 general election, he was elected Member of Parliament (MP) for Carmarthen District. Williams held the seat at both 1910 general elections. Politically, he has opposed the Boer War, was a supporter of Disestablishment of the Church in Wales and a Welsh Nationalist.

The Conservatives selected 48-year-old Henry Coulson Bond as their candidate. He was born in Berkshire and educated at Rugby School. Bond was a first time candidate.

The Labour party chose F.G. Vivian to contest the seat. He had not fought an election before, and Labour had not contested this seat before.

Result
The Liberal comfortably held the seat but with a reduced majority;

Aftermath
In February 1915, Williams was appointed Recorder of Cardiff and required to face another by-election, in which he was returned unopposed. Neither Bond nor Vivian stood for parliament again.

References

By-elections to the Parliament of the United Kingdom in Welsh constituencies
1912 elections in the United Kingdom
1912 in Wales
1910s elections in Wales
Elections in Carmarthenshire
20th century in Carmarthenshire